is a traditional Ryūkyūan home in Kumejima, Okinawa, Japan. It was the personal home of the Aji of Kume Island, built around 1750. There is a ¥300 entry fee.

References

Ryukyu Kingdom
Ryukyuan culture
Historic house museums in Japan
Buildings and structures in Okinawa Prefecture
Kumejima, Okinawa